Lotte Rysanek (18 March 1924 – 14 December 2016) was an Austrian operatic soprano. She was the sister of soprano Leonie Rysanek.

Life 
Born in Vienna, Rysanek was taught by Rudolf Grossmann at the Konservatorium Wien. In 1950, she made her debut as Manon in Klagenfurt in Jules Massenet's eponymous opera. From 1955 to 1987, she sang at the Wiener Staatsoper. She was also known as an operetta and concert singer. She appeared at the Bayreuth Festival as the fifth flower girl in Parsifal in 1957 and at her sister's side in 1958 as Helmwige in Die Walküre.

Rysanek died in Vienna at the age of 92. She was buried at the Hietzing Cemetery (group 68, row 7, number 7) in an Ehrengrab.

Awards 
 Bestowal of the professional title Kammersängerin
 1987:

Further reading 
 Uwe Harten: Rysanek, Schwestern. In Oesterreichisches Musiklexikon. Online-edition, Vienna 2002 ff., ; Print edition: Vol. 4, Publishing House of the Austrian Academy of Sciences, Vienna 2005, .

References

External links 
 
 
 
 

Austrian operatic sopranos
Österreichischer Kammersänger
1924 births
2016 deaths
Musicians from Vienna
20th-century Austrian women opera singers